Aurad Shahajani is a City in Latur district of Maharashtra, India.It is a major business hub near latur. Master Deenanath Mangeshkar College, started in June 1970 with auspicious hands of Lata Mangeshkar, a well Known Indian singer, run by Shardopasak Shikshan Sanstha.

Languages
Marathi is widely spoken in the region. Hindi, Urdu, Kannada and Telgu are also commonly spoken here in this village.

Location
Aurad Shahajani is located on the banks of Terna River in central west India. It is closer (approximately ) to Hyderabad in the state of Telangana than it is to the capital of Maharashtra state, Mumbai.

Geography and climate

Aurad Shahajani is situated 636 metres above mean sea level, on the Balaghat plateau, near the Maharashtra–Karnataka state boundary. It receives its drinking water from the nearby Terna River,Terna joins to Manjra river here at this village and then named Wanjara by the name of Wanjarkheda (a village at the other bank of river in Karnatka state) which suffered from environmental degradation and silting in the late 20th and early 21st centuries. Master Deenanath Mangeshkar Mahavidyalaya and some other villagers tried successfully to wide shape of river.

The lowest recorded temperature was4.5. .

Rainfall : Most of the rainfall occurs in the monsoon season from June to September. Rainfall varies from 9.0 to 693 mm/month. Average annual rainfall is 725 mm.

Culture

The well-known temple, Bhavani Temple, is dedicated to the Hindu goddess Bhavani. The temple has yearly enjoyed a special association with Chhatrapati Shivaji Maharaj jayanti .
Aurad Shahajani has balaji mandir which is dedicated to the Hindu god Venkateshwara. One Dattatraya Mandir is under construction behind MDM College.

Education facilities
Aurad Shahajani is also known for Master Deenanath Mangeshkar College, started in June 1970 with auspisious hands of Lata Mangeshkar,a well Known Indian singer, run by Shardopasak Shikshan Sanstha. Nowadays, more than 10 schools are in Aurad. More than 10,000 students are studying and thousands of students have got jobs. Major teachers have got doctorate and guide the students of M.Phil and Ph.D. Dr Ajitsingh Gaherwar is principal of this College. It has a technical school, the Bharat Ratna Lata Mangeshkar College of Engineering & Technology, Maharshtra Mahavidhyalaya,Pandit Virbhadraji Aarya Vidhyalaya. A well known English medium school is Universal Public school. The principal of this school is Pankaj Kulkarni. There a no too many English medium schools in Aurad . It offers courses in information technology, Arts, Science & commerce.
Those all under "Shardopasak Shikhan Sanstha" Aurad Shahajani.

Media and communication

Newspapers: Lokmat,Loksatta, Sakal, and Ekmat Punyanagri" are the most widely read Marathi newspapers in Aurad Shahajani.
Times of India & The Hindu English newspaper also read by some people.Lokman, Marathwada Neta, Punyanagri, Rajdharma, Sanchar, Sarathi Samachar, Tarun Bharat, and Yashwant, are some other Marathi daily newspapers available in.

NGO's Facilities
NGO Registerd Under NGO Darpan Gov of India''

NGO Name Gramin Divyangjan Kalyan Shikshan Sanstha 

The void created the longing to do something for the disabled children and their frail, desperate parents did not allow them to remain silent. At that time, special children's education was available only in the district. There was no such education facility in my village “Aurad Shahajani” and its environs. Decided to spend the rest of my life for such disabled children in Village. Without waiting for the moment like Shubhasya Shighram, I took some of my close teacher friends with me and surveyed the entire Aurad shahajani Village by category. In the survey, we were able to see the problems of children, the problems of parents, their sufferings very closely. Disable children and their parents decided to plant a bud of hope in their minds which will surely become a banyan tree in the future.

Gramin Divyangjan Kalyan Shikshan Sanstha was established on September 3, 2021 with the objective of educating and rehabilitating
children with disabilities (mentally retarded, deaf, blind, orthopedic) in the mainstream of society.

Demographics
In the 2001 Indian census, the suburb of Aurad shahajani recorded inhabitants,  males (51.4%) and females (48.6%), for a gender ratio of 945 females per 1000 males.

References

Villages in Latur district
Villages in Nilanga taluka